Torellia planispira is a species of small sea snail, a marine gastropod mollusk in the family Capulidae, the cap snails.

Distribution

Description 
The maximum recorded shell length is 15 mm.

Habitat 
Minimum recorded depth is 412 m. Maximum recorded depth is 412 m.

References

External links

Capulidae
Gastropods described in 1915